Özgül is a common feminine Turkish given name. In Turkish, "Özgül" means "specific".

People

 Özgül Koşar, actress.
 Özgül Küçük, cryptography researcher at Katholieke Universiteit Leuven

Fictional characters

 Ayla Özgül, in German television soap opera Gute Zeiten, schlechte Zeiten

Turkish feminine given names